The men's marathon at the 1997 World Championships in Athletics was held in Athens, Greece, on Sunday August 10, 1997.

Medalists

Records

Final ranking

See also
 Men's Olympic Marathon (1996)
 1997 World Marathon Cup

References
 Results
 Results - World Athletics

Marathon
Marathons at the World Athletics Championships
World Championships
Men's marathons
Marathons in Greece